Dichelonychini is a tribe of beetles, known as May beetles and Junebugs, in the family Scarabaeidae. There are at least 3 genera and 60 described species in Dichelonychini.

Genera
These three genera belong to the tribe Dichelonychini:
 Coenonycha Horn, 1876 i c g b
 Dichelonyx Harris, 1827 i c g b
 Gymnopyge Linell, 1896 i c g b
Data sources: i = ITIS, c = Catalogue of Life, g = GBIF, b = Bugguide.net

References

Further reading

 
 
 
 
 
 

Melolonthinae
Articles created by Qbugbot